World No. 1 Caroline Wozniacki defeated Elena Vesnina in the final 6–2, 6–3 to win the women's singles tennis title at the 2011 Charleston Open.
Samantha Stosur was the defending champion, but lost to Vesnina in the third round.

Seeds
The top eight seeds received a bye into the second round.

Draw

Finals

Top half

Section 1

Section 2

Bottom half

Section 3

Section 4

Qualifying

Players

Seeds

Qualifiers

Qualifying draw

First qualifier

Second qualifier

Third qualifier

Fourth qualifier

Fifth qualifier

Sixth qualifier

Seventh qualifier

Eighth qualifier

References
Qualifying draw
Main draw

Family Circle Cup - Singles
Charleston Open